The 1946 All-Southern Conference football team consists of American football players chosen by coaches and sports writers on behalf of the Associated Press (AP) and United Press (UP) as the best at each position from the Southern Conference during the 1946 college football season.

Two triple-threat backs, Howard "Touchdown" Turner of NC State and Nick Sacrinty of Wake Forest, were rated as the most consistent players in the conference.

Duke led the conference with three players chosen on the first team: end Kelly Mote; tackle Al DeRogatis; and guard Bill Milner. William & Mary followed with two players on the first team: back Jack Cloud and guard Knox Ramsey. DeRogatis, Cloud, and NC State halfback Charlie Justice were late inducted into the College Football Hall of Fame.

All-Southern Conference selections

Backs
 Charlie Justice, North Carolina (AP-1, UP-1)
 Howard Turner, NC State (AP-1, UP-1)
 Nick Sacrinty, Wake Forest (AP-1, UP-1)
 Jack Cloud, William & Mary (AP-1, UP-1)
 Robert Thomason, VMI (AP-2, UP-2)
 George Clark, Duke (AP-2, UP-2)
 Leo Long, Duke (AP-2, UP-3)
 Tommy Korczowski, William & Mary (AP-3, UP-2)
 Harold Hagain, South Carolina (AP-3, UP-2)
 Richard Brinkley, Wake Forest (AP-2)
 Nick Ognivich, Wake Forest (AP-3)
 Hosea Rodgers, North Carolina (AP-3)
 Earl Dunham, South Carolina (UP-3)
 Buddy Milligan, Duke (UP-3)
 Walt Pupa, North Carolina (UP-3)

Ends
 Kelly Mote, Duke (AP-1, UP-1)
 Bill Chipley, Washington & Lee (AP-1, UP-2)
 Paul Gibson, NC State (AP-2, UP-1)
 Robert Steckroth, William & Mary (AP-2, UP-3)
 Art Weiner, North Carolina (UP-2)
 John O'Quinn, Wake Forest (AP-3, UP-3)
 U.S. Savage, Richmond (AP-3)

Tackles
 Al Derogatis, Duke (AP-1, UP-1)
 John Maskas, VPI (AP-1, UP-1)
 Ralph Sazio, William & Mary (AP-2)
 Ted Hazelwood, North Carolina (AP-2, UP-3)
 Dom Fusci, South Carolina (AP-3, UP-2)
 Taylor Moser, NC State (UP-2)
 Malachi Mills, VMI (AP-3)
 Louis Allen, Duke (UP-3)

Guards
 Knox Ramsey, William & Mary (AP-1, UP-1)
 Bill Milner, Duke (AP-1, UP-1)
 Bernard Watts, NC State (AP-2)
 Ernest Knotts, Duke (AP-2, UP-3)
 Ralph Strayhorn, North Carolina (UP-2)
 Harry Varney, North Carolina (AP-3)
 Bob Leonetti, Wake Forest (AP-3, UP-2)
 Frank Gillespie, Clemson (UP-3)

Centers
 Bryant Meeks, South Carolina (AP-1, UP-1)
 Chan Highsmith, North Carolina (AP-2, UP-2)
 Tommy Thompon, William & Mary (AP-3)
 Ralph Jenkins, Clemson (UP-3)

Key

See also
1946 College Football All-America Team

References

All-Southern Conference football team
All-Southern Conference football teams